Baghi Sipahi is a 1958 Indian Hindi-language film directed by Bhagwan Das Varma and starring Madhubala, Chandrashekhar and Ranjan. It is loosely based on the 1951 American film Quo Vadis, which in turn was adapted from the 1896 book with the same title by Henryk Sienkiewicz. Baghi Sipahi was released on 1 January 1958.

Plot 
Baghi Sipahi is set in Rome in Nero's time, and has a theme based on Christians and their persecution by the Roman Empire.

The film tells the story of a Roman military commander (Chandrashekhar), who, after returning from the war, falls in love with Ranjana (Madhubala), a devout Christian.  Ranjana is technically a hostage of the Roman Emperor (Ranjan). However, as a reward for his services, the commander is able to persuade the Emperor to give Ranjana to him.  Although Ranjana resents this arrangement, she eventually falls in love with the commander.

As the film progresses, the Emperor's massacres of the Christians become progressively more despicable. When the kingdom catches fire, the Emperor blames the Christians at the suggestion of his wife (Nishi). This in turn leads to more atrocities toward the Christians, instigating the commander to become a rebel soldier to protect Ranjana and the Christian community.

Much of the movie proceeds with the cruel spectacles that ensue with the increasingly irrational behavior of the Emperor. Ultimately, the commander succeeds in overturning the situation, leading to the demise of the Emperor with the assistance of a palace slave (Purnima), who was once in unreciprocated love with the Emperor.

Cast 
Madhubala as Ranjana
Chandrashekhar as the military commander
Ranjan as the Emperor
Nishi as the Emperor's wife
Om Prakash
Purnima as a palace slave
Gope
Sapru

Soundtrack 
The soundtrack of Baghi Sipahi was composed by Shankar–Jaikishan.

Reception 

A review by Thought disliked the fact that Madhubala was present in almost the whole film, but found her to be "vivacious" in her role. The sets and other actors were only formally praised. However, according to Thought, the lavish war scenes were great in visuals.

References

External links 

1950s Hindi-language films
1958 films